Korab is a mountain range in the eastern corner of Albania and the western part of North Macedonia, running along the border between both countries. It forms also the European Green Belt. In Albania, it is also called Vargu lindor, but this term encompasses mountains further north, such as the Koritnik and Gjallica. The mountains are composed of sedimentary rock, including shale, sandstone, dolomite and limestone. The name refers to a Paleochristian sea god.

Geographically, the Korab mountain range extends   from the Dibër Valley in a north-south direction, between the river valleys of the Black Drin and its tributary the Radika. It is located near the tripoint of Albania, North Macedonia, and Kosovo, southwest of the Šar Mountains.

The geology of the park is dominated by mountains made up of exposed faulted sedimentary rock and valleys containing glacial lakes.

The Albanian part has numerous high peaks and ranges, almost as tall as the Korab massif. To the north of this double-peak there are many other nameless peaks of a similar height. A few hundred meters further south, there are another peaks, Maja e Moravës  and Mali i Gramës . The mountains are composed of shale and limestone. Much of the range is protected by nature parks; the Korab-Koritnik Nature Park.

South of the complex of peaks around Mount Korab, there are other large mountains: Mali i Gramës and Dešat's Velivar summit. After that, the range falls away to the city of Debar and the Debar Lake. The city of Peshkopi is to the southwest of Mali i Gramës and has geothermal baths.

Image gallery

See also 

 Geography of Albania
 Geography of North Macedonia

References 

Mountain ranges of Albania
Mountain ranges of North Macedonia
Protected areas of Dibër County